Aisa Black Agaba is a Ugandan politician and legislator. She represents the people of Bugangaizi east in Kibale district as constituency representative (MP) in the parliament of Uganda.

Background 
Agaba is a member of the National Resistance Movement (NRM) a party under the chairmanship of Yoweri Kaguta Museveni president of the republic of Uganda.  She defeated the former MP Twinamatsiko Onesmus in the NRM primary elections and in the 2021 Uganda general elections.

Career 
In the parliament of Uganda, Agaba serves on the committee on physical infrastructure.

References 

Women members of the Parliament of Uganda
Members of the Parliament of Uganda
21st-century Ugandan women politicians
21st-century Ugandan politicians
National Resistance Movement politicians
Year of birth missing (living people)
Living people